Forty-shilling freeholders were those who had the parliamentary franchise to vote by virtue of possessing freehold property, or lands held directly of the king, of an annual rent of at least forty shillings (i.e. £2 or 3 marks), clear of all charges.

The qualification to vote using the ownership and value of property, and the creation of a group of forty-shilling freeholders, was practiced in many jurisdictions such as England, Scotland, Ireland, the United States of America, Australia and Canada.

History

During the Second Barons' War, Simon de Montfort, 6th Earl of Leicester instigated the English parliament of 1265, without royal approval. Simon de Montfort's army had met and defeated the royal forces at the Battle of Lewes on May 14, 1264. Montfort sent out representatives to each county and to a select list of boroughs, asking each to send two representatives, and insisted the representatives be elected. Henry III rejected the new Parliament and resumed his war against Montfort, who was killed later that year at the Battle of Evesham, but the idea of electing Knights of the Shire as representatives of the counties, and burgesses from the boroughs, became a permanent feature.

In 1430, legislation limited the franchise to only those who owned the freehold of land that brought in an annual rent of at least 40 shillings (forty-shilling freeholders). For comparison: In the mid 1340s, a knight received a daily pay of two shillings while on campaign, an ordinary man-at-arms the half of it, a foot archer was paid two or three pence (12 pennies to the shilling and 20 shillings to the pound). A war-horse could value from five to 100 pounds.

The legislation did not specify the gender of the property owner, however the franchise became restricted to males by custom. In subsequent centuries, until the 1832 Great Reform Act specified 'male persons', a few women were able to vote in parliamentary elections through property ownership, although this was rare.

England and Wales
Until legislation in the fifteenth century the franchise for elections of knights of the shire to serve as the representatives of counties in the Parliament of England was not restricted to forty-shilling freeholders.
	
The Yale historian Charles Seymour (Electoral Reform in England and Wales: The Development and Operation of the Parliamentary Franchise, 1832-1885. New Haven: Yale University Press) discussing the original county franchise, suggested that "it is probable that all free inhabitant householders voted and that the parliamentary qualification was, like that which compelled attendance in the county court, merely a "resiance" or residence qualification".  Seymour explains why Parliament decided to limit the county franchise: "The Act of 1430, after declaring that elections had been crowded by many persons of low estate, and that confusion had thereby resulted, accordingly enacted that the suffrage should be limited to persons qualified by a freehold of 40s".

The Parliament of England legislated the new uniform county franchise, in the statute 8 Hen. VI (/6), c. 7. However the Chronological Table of the Statutes does not mention such a 1430 law, as it was included in the Consolidated Statutes as a recital in the Electors of Knights of the Shire Act 1432 (10 Hen. VI, c. 2), which amended and re-enacted the 1430 law to make clear that the resident of a county had to have a forty-shilling freehold in that county to be a voter there.
 
Over the course of time many different types of property were accepted as being forty-shilling freeholds and the residence requirement disappeared.

According to Seymour, "this qualification was broader in practice than would appear at first glance, since the term freehold was applicable to many kinds of property. An explanatory act of parliament, it is true, confined it to lands of purely freehold tenure; but notwithstanding this purely formal declaration, the wider interpretation of the meaning of freeholder persisted, and we read of many freehold voters who were enfranchised by such qualifications as annuities and rent charges issuing out of freehold lands, and even dowers of wives and pews in churches. After the Restoration the electoral rights of clergymen were recognised by statute and church offices were held to confer a county franchise; this interpretation widened commensurately with the financial possibilities and value of a vote. A chorister of Ely Cathedral, the butler and brewer of Westminster Abbey, the bell-ringer, the gardener, the cook and the organ-blower, all voted by virtue of their supposedly ecclesiastical offices. In 1835 the members of a vestry in Marylebone succeeded in qualifying as electors from a burial ground attached to the parish...".

Because of the above interpretations and as the qualifying figure was not uplifted or based on backdated valuations (to take account of inflation as in Scotland, where to be a shire elector required ownership of land worth forty shillings of old extent) the number of qualified voters gradually expanded. Tempering this extension to the franchise were laws proposed by objectors (such as King William IV in 1832) who deemed the non-landowning office holders and smallest landowners/investors as a dangerously large franchise.
 

A disputed point, on which the Whig majority in the Commons prevailed, was that freeholders in boroughs who did not occupy their property should vote in the counties in which the borough was situated. The Tories objected that urban interests would affect the representation of agricultural areas. The Whigs pointed out this had always been the case with urban areas not previously represented as borough constituencies (which had included major centres of wealth and population like Birmingham, Leeds and Manchester as well as the rapidly growing suburbs of London). This provision proved to be damaging to the Liberal cause later in the century.

It was found that about 70% of the county constituency electorate after passage of the Reform Act 1832 still qualified to vote.

From 1885 the property-owning franchise became less important than the occupancy one. Only about 20% of the county electorate were freeholders in 1886 and the proportion declined to about 16% in 1902.

In 1918, with the introduction of a full adult male franchise, property qualifications only affected some of the new women voters (who were not occupiers of a dwelling or the wife of an occupier, in the constituency) and plural voting business property owners. They needed respectively a £5 and £10 qualification — the forty shilling qualification ended. Universal adult suffrage was enacted in 1928 and the remaining plural votes were abolished by the Representation of the People Act 1948 so that by and since the 1950 United Kingdom general election no voters have qualified on the basis of the ownership of land.

Ireland
Similarly in Ireland before 1829 the franchise for county constituencies was restricted to forty-shilling freeholders.  This gave anyone who owned or rented land that was worth forty shillings (two pounds) or more, the right to vote.  As a consequence they were given the nickname, the "forty-shilling freeholders".  This included  many Roman Catholics who obtained the vote under the Catholic Relief Act 1793, at first for the Parliament of Ireland and then from 1801 for the Parliament of the United Kingdom.

The Catholic Relief Act 1829 raised the franchise qualification to ten pounds, excluding many previous voters, Protestant and Catholic, and this remained the basis of the county franchise in Ireland until it was widened in 1885.

The forty shilling qualification continued after 1829 in Irish boroughs, which had the status of a corporate county (a county of itself). An example was Cork City.

A Topographical Directory of Ireland, published in 1837, describes the area covered by the Cork borough constituency.

The county of the city comprises a populous rural district of great beauty and fertility, watered by several small rivulets and intersected by the river Lee and its noble estuary: it is bounded on the north by the barony of Fermoy, on the east by that of Barrymore, on the south by Kerricurrihy, and on the west by Muskerry: it comprehends the parishes of St. Finbarr, Christ-Church or the Holy Trinity, St. Peter, St. Mary Shandon, St. Anne Shandon, St. Paul and St. Nicholas, all, except part of St. Finbarr's, within the city and suburbs, and those of Curricuppane, Carrigrohanemore, Kilcully, and Rathcoony, together with parts of the parishes of Killanully or Killingly, Carrigaline, Dunbullogue or Carrignavar, Ballinaboy, Inniskenny, Kilnaglory, White-church, and Templemichael, without those limits; and contains, according to the Ordnance survey, an area of 44,463 statute acres, of which, 2396 are occupied by the city and suburbs.

The Directory also has a passage on the representative history. Other, more modern, sources ascribe an earlier date to the start of the parliamentary representation of Cork; but the passage confirms the survival of the 40 shilling qualification..

The city first sent members to the Irish parliament in 1374, but representatives who appear to have served in London were chosen previously. The right of election was vested in the freemen of the city, and in the 40s. freeholders and £50 leaseholders of the county of the city, of whom the freemen, in 1831, amounted in number to 2331, and the freeholders to 1545, making a total of 3876; but by the act of the 2nd of Wm. IV., cap. 88 (under which the city, from its distinguished importance, retains its privilege of returning two representatives to the Imperial parliament, and the limits of the franchise, comprising the entire county of the city, remain unaltered), the non-resident freemen, except within seven miles, have been disfranchised, and the privilege of voting at elections has been extended to the £10 householders, and the £20 and £10 leaseholders for the respective terms of 14 and 20 years. The number of voters registered up to Jan. 2nd, 1836, amounted to 4791, of whom 1065 were freemen; 2727 £10 householders; 105 £50, 152 £20, and 608 forty-shilling freeholders; 3 £50, 7 £20, and 2 £10 rent-chargers; and 1 £50, 26 £20, and 95 £10 leaseholders: the sheriffs are the returning officers.

See also
 Parliamentary franchise in the United Kingdom 1885–1918 including a summary of the qualifications for the forty-shilling freehold franchise during the final years of its existence.
 Montfort's Parliament
 Knights of the Shire
 Henry III of England
 Simon de Montfort, 6th Earl of Leicester
 Weighted voting

References

Bibliography
 Chronological Table of the Statutes: Part 1 1235-1962 (The Stationery Office Ltd 1999)
 The Constitutional Year Book 1900 (William Blackstone & Sons 1900)
 Representation of the People Act 1918 (printed by authority in the Statutes for 1918)
 The Statutes: Revised Edition, Vol. I Henry III to James II (printed by authority in 1876)
 The Statutes: Second Revised Edition, Vol. XVI 1884-1886 (printed by authority in 1900)

Political history of medieval England
Parliament of England